is a Japanese manga series written by Buronson and illustrated by Ryoichi Ikegami. It was serialized in Shogakukan's seinen manga magazine Big Comic Superior from September 2004 to February 2011, with its chapters collected in twenty-two tankōbon volumes. The story is loosely based on the Three Kingdoms period, using both real and original characters and events from the historical period in Chinese history and folklore of the 14th century novel Romance of the Three Kingdoms by Luo Guanzhong. A sequel, titled Soul: Lord 2, was serialized in the same magazine from June 2011 to January 2013, with its chapters collected in three tankōbon volumes.

Publication
Written by Buronson and illustrated by Ryoichi Ikegami, Lord was serialized in Shogakukan's seinen manga magazine Big Comic Superior from September 10, 2004, to February 10, 2011. Shogakukan collected its chapters in twenty-two tankōbon volumes, released from January 28, 2005, to March 30, 2011.

A second part, was serialized in Big Comic Spirits from June 10, 2011, to January 11, 2013. Shogakukan collected its chapters in three tankōbon volumes, released from February 29, 2012, to March 29, 2013.

Volume list

Lord

Soul: Lord 2

Notes

References

External links
 

Action anime and manga
Epic anime and manga
Historical anime and manga
Ryoichi Ikegami
Seinen manga
Shogakukan manga
Works based on Romance of the Three Kingdoms
Yoshiyuki Okamura